Bernt Haas (born 8 April 1978) is a former Swiss football defender. He is now Sporting Director of Grasshopper Club Zürich.

Career

Club
Haas was born in Vienna, Austria. He played his early youth football with local club FC Freienbach before he moved to the youth department of Grasshoppers Zurich. Aged just 16 years he signed his first professional contract and advanced from the U-21 team to GC first team under head coach Christian Gross during the 1994–95 Nationalliga A season. Haas played his debut on 31 May 1995 as GC won an away game 3–1 against Lausanne-Sport. At the end of the season he won the Swiss Championship. Haas play his Champions League debut on 1 November 1995 as GC played a goalless draw against Ajax. Haas played with GC for seven seasons before moving to England to join Premier League club Sunderland in August 2001. Despite making 27 appearances for the club in 2001–02, he did not play for Sunderland during the following season and was loaned out to FC Basel.

On 30 August 2002 it was announced that Haas had joined Basel's first team during their 2002–03 season under head coach Christian Gross, who in the meantime had moved on. Haas played his domestic league debut for the club in the home game in the St. Jakob-Park on 11 September 2002 as Basel won 7–1 against Wil. Basel advanced to the group stage and they ended this in second position behind Valencia, but ahead of Liverpool and Spartak Moscow to advance to the second group stage. They ended this in third position behind Manchester United and Juventus, but ahead of Deportivo La Coruña. Haas scored his first goal for the club on 8 March 2003 in the home game as Basel won 2–0 against Servette. 

Although Basel had a buy out option in the loan contract, Hass decided he wanted to return to England. During his 10 months with the club he played a total of 43 games for Basel scoring that one goal. 22 of these games were in the Swiss Super League, four in the Swiss Cup, 11 in the Champions League and six were friendly games.

Haas joined West Bromwich Albion in 2003, and was a regular at right-back as Albion were promoted back to the Premier League. He scored with a superb volley in the 2–0 League Cup win against Manchester United, having already scored in an earlier round against Brentford. He also scored once in the league against Crewe. However, he found his chances limited in the top-flight, and left the club by mutual consent on 21 January 2005. The following day he signed for SC Bastia in France, whom he played for prior to joining 1. FC Köln. 

After just one season at Cologne, he joined Swiss Super League club FC St. Gallen in 2007. But injuries obstructed his progress. The career of the strong right-back ended in some doctor's room in St. Gallen. Cartilage damage and osteoarthritis in the knee.

International
Haas played for the Swiss national team at Euro 2004 and was sent off in the match against England.

Post-retirement
Following his retirement in 2010, Haas decided to go self-employed and became a player consultant. He functioned as director of football for Lichtensteiner club FC Vaduz from 2015 until 2018. He remained living in Wollerau and commuted the 40 minutes by car to the Principality.

Between 2020 and 2022, he functioned as Sporting Director at Swiss Challenge League side FC Schaffhausen.

On July 1 2022, he was appointed Sporting Director of his former club Grasshopper Club Zürich.

Personal life
He has a twin sister named Dina, once a talented sports photographer and well known in the football business.

Haas once worked as a model for Armani.

Career statistics
Source:

Honours
Grasshoppers
Swiss Championship (4): 1994–95, 1995–96, 1997–98, 2000–01

FC Basel
Swiss Cup: 2003

References

Sources
 Die ersten 125 Jahre. Publisher: Josef Zindel im Friedrich Reinhardt Verlag, Basel. 
 Verein "Basler Fussballarchiv" Homepage

External links

1978 births
Living people
Footballers from Vienna
Association football defenders
Swiss men's footballers
Switzerland international footballers
Swiss expatriate sportspeople in England
Swiss expatriate sportspeople in France
Swiss expatriate sportspeople in Germany
Expatriate footballers in England
Expatriate footballers in France
Swiss expatriate footballers
Sunderland A.F.C. players
FC Basel players
FC St. Gallen players
West Bromwich Albion F.C. players
SC Bastia players
1. FC Köln players
Swiss Super League players
Premier League players
English Football League players
Ligue 1 players
2. Bundesliga players
UEFA Euro 2004 players
Expatriate footballers in Germany
Swiss-German people